Nughab (also Romanized as Nūghāb; also known as Nowghāb-e Zīrak, Naughā, and Nowgāh) is a village in Kahshang Rural District, in the Central District of Birjand County, South Khorasan Province, Iran. At the 2006 census, its population was 105, in 42 families.

References 

Populated places in Birjand County